The  deep Puysegur Trench is a deep cleft in the floor of the south Tasman Sea formed by the subduction of the Indo-Australian Plate under the Pacific Plate to the south of New Zealand. Immediately to its east lies a ridge, a northern extension of the Macquarie Ridge, which separates the Puysegur Trench from the Solander Trough. To the west is the expanse of the Tasman Basin, which stretches most of the distance to Australia. To the north of the trench lies the Fiordland Basin, which can be considered an extension of the trench. The Puysegur Trench mirrors the Kermadec Trench and Tonga Trench north of New Zealand.

The Puysegur Trench stretches for over 800 kilometres south from the southwesternmost point of the South Island's coast, its southernmost extent being 400 kilometres due west of the Auckland Islands. It is named after Puysegur Point.

Earthquakes
The area around the Puysegur Trench is highly seismically active, with the Alpine Fault starting at the trench's northern end. In July 2009, New Zealand's third-largest recorded earthquake (magnitude 7.8) struck close to the northern end of the trench off the coast of Fiordland. A magnitude 7.2 quake hit the trench itself in November 2004.

References

External links
 Puysegur Trench

Zealandia
Geography of the New Zealand seabed
Oceanic trenches of the Pacific Ocean
Subduction zones